J. Thom Lawler was an American ice hockey player and coach who won the inaugural NCAA Division II national championship in 1978 with Merrimack.

Career
A veteran of the Korean War, Lawler played three seasons at St. Lawrence during their heyday under George Menard. Lawler helped the Saints to back-to-back Tri-State League championships in 1959 and 1960 receiving the top eastern seed both years. While Lawler's team fell just short in his junior season with two overtime losses in the 1959 NCAA Tournament they fell flat in their return the following year, losing in the semifinal to Michigan Tech 3–13.

Several years after graduating, Lawler was given an opportunity to coach Merrimack when former head coach Ron Ryan left after one season behind the bench. Lawler's first season ended with a poor 8–10–1 record but the following season saw the Warriors finish 4th in the ECAC 2 and qualify for the first tournament in conference history. After dropping league champion Norwich 12–3 in the semifinal the Warriors defeated Colby 6–4 to capture their first conference championship. Lawler's team repeated as champions the following year while also claiming their first regular season title, going 12–1 in conference play. After winning a second league title in 1969 Merrimack declined for a couple years before building back up into a conference powerhouse. for three consecutive years from 1975 through 1977 Merrimack won the ECAC 2 regular season title, going 63–8–2 over those three seasons and were finally able to win their third conference championship in 1977. The NCAA instituted a Division II national championship for the 1977-78 season and Merrimack responded by finishing second in the conference. The Warriors fell in the ECAC 2 title game to Bowdoin, however, because university policy prohibited Bowdoin from participating in national tournaments Merrimack was invited to take place in the tournament as the ECAC East representative.

Lawler's team opened against Mankato State and won the game fairly easily (6–1). In the championship game they faced off against Lake Forest and completely took over the game, eventually winning by a score of 12–2.

Unfortunately two months after the tournament Lawler suffered a heart attack and died at the age of 44.

After his untimely death Lawler was honored for his accomplishments. Merrimack renamed their home rink in his honor and began awarding alumni the J. Thom Lawler Award for their contributions to the ice hockey program. The NCAA also confers an annual J. Thom Lawler award to the Division II or III player from New England for their commitment to their program, university and community. in 1995 he was inducted in the Rome, New York sports hall of fame.

Personal life
Lawler's son, Tom Lawler, was a freshman at Merrimack when J. Thom died. He completed his four years at the college, finishing second in career points (he sits 4th as of 2018) and captaining the team in his senior season.

Head coaching record

See also
 J. Thom Lawler Rink

References

External links

1978 deaths
American military personnel of the Korean War
American ice hockey coaches
Merrimack Warriors men's ice hockey coaches
St. Lawrence Saints men's ice hockey players
Ice hockey coaches from New York (state)
People from Rome, New York
American men's ice hockey left wingers
Ice hockey players from New York (state)